Meshak Williams (born June 3, 1991) is an American football defensive end who is currently a free agent. He played college football at Kansas State. He was considered a draftable prospect in the 2013 NFL Draft.

High school
Meshak attended Worth County High School in Sylvester, Georgia. He lettered three years for the Worth County Rams at defensive end and tight end, advancing to the Georgia state playoffs his sophomore and junior seasons. He recorded 70 tackles to go along with 14 sacks as a junior, while he tallied 83 tackles and a school-record 23 sacks as a senior. Rated as a two-star recruit by Rivals.com, he accepted a scholarship offer from Kansas State.

College career

Hutchinson Community College
Meshak did not qualify for Kansas State, so he decided to play at Hutchinson Community College until he could be academically qualified. After his 2009 season, he played in 12 games in 2010, recording 44 tackles (18 solo, 26 assisted) as well as 17.0 tackles for a loss, also had eight sacks.

Kansas State
After two years at community college, Williams enrolled at Kansas State in 2011. As a junior, he recorded 28 tackles, including 10 for loss and seven sacks to go along with a forced fumble and a recovery. He was tied for sixth in the Big 12 in sacks, while his total was the most by a Wildcat in three years. As a senior in 2012, he improved upon his junior statistics and became one of the most prominent defensive players in the Big 12. He recorded 45 tackles, including 17 for loss and eleven sacks to go along with three forced fumbles. He was named to the All-Big 12 first-team.

Professional career

Baltimore Ravens
Meshak went undrafted in the 2013 NFL Draft. He was signed as an undrafted free agent by the Baltimore Ravens. He spent the 2013 summer in Albany, Georgia training with the Deerfield-Windsor School Knights football team, the 2012 GISA AAA state champions. On August 25, 2013, he was waived by the Ravens.

Orlando Predators
In 2014, Williams joined the AFL's Orlando Predators. He recorded 2 tackles in one game in 2014 and 29.5 tackles with 5.5 sacks in 17 games in 2015.

Cleveland Gladiators
On April 19, 2016, Williams was assigned to the Cleveland Gladiators. On June 7, 2016, Williams was placed on reassignment.

Texas Revolution
On January 9, 2017, Williams signed with the Texas Revolution.

Tampa Bay Storm
On July 26, 2017, Williams was assigned to the Tampa Bay Storm. The Storm folded in December 2017.

References

External links

Kansas State Wildcats bio 
Cleveland Gladiators bio

1991 births
Living people
American football defensive ends
Hutchinson Blue Dragons football players
Kansas State Wildcats football players
People from Sylvester, Georgia
Players of American football from Georgia (U.S. state)
Salina Bombers players
Orlando Predators players
Cleveland Gladiators players
Texas Revolution players
Tampa Bay Storm players
Baltimore Ravens players